Black Messiah may refer to:

The Black Messiah, a 1972 album by Cannonball Adderley
Black Messiah (album), a 2014 album by D'Angelo and The Vanguard
"Black Messiah" (song), a 1978 song by The Kinks
Black Messiah (band), a German Viking/symphonic black metal band
"Black Messiah", a 2021 song by Rakim from the Judas and the Black Messiah soundtrack

See also
Race and appearance of Jesus, for theories on the subject of Jesus' race
COINTELPRO, American covert and illegal projects from 1956 to disrupt political organizations